Barclays Wealth Management serves affluent and high net worth clients through offices across the UK, offering personalised banking, credit, investment management and wealth planning services.

Reported client assets were £202.8 billion (as of 30 June 2013).

In May 2013, Peter Horrell was named interim Chief Executive of the Wealth and Investment Management division of Barclays reporting to Antony Jenkins, Barclays Group Chief Executive. Horrell was permanently appointed Chief Executive in September 2013. Akshaya Bhargava succeeded him as Chief Executive on 13 October 2014.

Dena Brumpton joined in September 2015 as new Chief Executive of Barclays Wealth Management. In December 2016, she was appointed CEO of the newly formed Wealth & Investments business, which incorporated the UK Savings business in March 2018. In July 2018, Barclays announced the retirement of Dena Brumpton and the appointment of Dirk Klee as her successor, both effective from September 2018.

Barclays is a transatlantic consumer and wholesale bank offering products and services across personal, corporate and investment banking, credit cards and wealth management, with a strong presence in its two home markets of the UK and the US.

With over 325 years of history and expertise in banking, Barclays operates in over 40 countries and employs approximately 80,000 people. Barclays moves, lends, invests and protects money for customers and clients worldwide.

Community investment and sponsorships 
Barclays Wealth has an active community investment programme in many of the jurisdictions in which it operates, with a particular focus on providing grants to charities helping disadvantaged people work towards financial independence and security.

The firm also has a policy of encouraging employees in their personal charitable giving and fundraising efforts. Staff are able to volunteer in work time and Barclays Wealth will match any monies raised through a staff member's individual fundraising efforts.

Notable persons
Mark Gilbert, American Major League Baseball player, and US Ambassador to New Zealand and Samoa

References

External links

Official site
Official site for the Americas
Official Barclays Stockbrokers website m.williams 

Banks of the United Kingdom
Barclays
Investment management companies of the United Kingdom
Offshore finance